Hussar Fever (German: Husarenfieber) is a 1925 German silent comedy film directed by Georg Jacoby and starring Max Hansen, Georg Alexander and Jakob Tiedtke.

The film's sets were designed by the art director Robert A. Dietrich.

Cast
Max Hansen
Georg Alexander
Jakob Tiedtke
Edith Meller
Elga Brink
Paul Otto
Paul Heidemann
Paula Eberty 
Edith Heuss
Arnold Korff
Rudolf Maas
Hans Mierendorff
Waldemar Potier as Kind  
Lotte Stein
Hans Wassmann

References

External links

Films of the Weimar Republic
Films directed by Georg Jacoby
German silent feature films
German comedy films
1925 comedy films
German films based on plays
German black-and-white films
Silent comedy films
1920s German films
1920s German-language films